Steven Kapur  (born 11 May 1967), known by the stage name Apache Indian, is a British singer-songwriter and reggae DJ. He had a series of hits during the 1990s. He is best known in the UK for the song "Boom Shack-A-Lak", which reached the top ten during August 1993.

Biography and career
Born into a family of Indian origins, Kapur was raised in Handsworth, Birmingham, UK, a racially mixed area with large Black and Asian communities, home of reggae bands such as Steel Pulse, and by the early 1980s he was working with local sound systems and grew dreadlocks. By the mid-1980s he had trimmed his hair and began to make a name for himself as a dancehall deejay. Apache recorded his first single in 1990, "Movie Over India", initially a white-label pressing, until it was picked up by the reggae distributor Jet Star. The single mixed ragga and bhangra sounds and was hugely popular among audiences of both genres. Two further singles followed in a similar vein, "Chok There" and "Don Raja", bringing him to the attention of the major labels, and in 1992 he signed a recording contract with Island Records.

With the collaboration of his cousins Simon & Diamond, he introduced the new hybrid sound of bhangra raggamuffin – also known as bhangramuffin – to the world with his first album No Reservations, recorded in Jamaica and produced by Simon & Diamond, Phil Chill, Robert Livingston, Bobby Digital and Sly Dunbar in 1993. It was followed by Make Way for the Indian (produced by Sly & Robbie, The Press, Mafia & Fluxy, Pandit Dineysh and Chris Lane), which featured rapper Tim Dog and spawned the hit "Boom Shack-A-Lak". By 1997 he parted ways with Island and his next album, "Real People" (produced by Harjinder Boparai) was signed and released by Warner Bros. Sweden and proved to be his most experimental album, and also featured more Indian elements than the other albums. By 2000, Apache had parted ways with Warner; he later signed to US management company Sunset Entertainment Group, which would lead later on in 2013 for Apache to collaborate on an album with hit producers Jim Beanz & Charlie Hype (both also signed to Sunset Entertainment Group).

Lyrically, Apache Indian usually sings in Jamaican Patois. He has written songs about serious topics, such as "Arranged Marriage", "Aids Warning", and "Election Crisis". as well as lighter songs such as "Boom Shack-A-Lak", "Jump Up", "Girls Dem Fiyah", and "Celebrate".

Apache Indian has recorded with Wreckx 'n' Effect, the United States chart topper Sean Paul, Maxi Priest, General Levy, Brian and Tony Gold, Frankie Paul, Shaggy, Yami Bolo, Boy George, A. R. Rahman,Bappi Lahiri, Sameera Singh, Asha Bhosle and Pras of the Fugees, Malkit Singh, and with Jazzy B on the album Dil Luteya, StereoNation, Sasi the Don, Bally Sagoo, Raghav, and Jim Beanz.

"Boom Shack-A-Lak" is featured in several Hollywood movies, including Dumb and Dumber and Dumb and Dumber To. It is also featured on the soundtrack for Scooby-Doo 2: Monsters Unleashed, along with artists such as Fatboy Slim, The B-52's, 2 Unlimited and New Radicals and the movie Threesome.

In 2018, he co-hosted the Brit Asia TV Music Awards with Preeya Kalidas.

His single "Om Namaha Shivaya" is on the Putumayo World Music compilation album, World Reggae which is a collection of reggae tracks performed by artists from around the world.

Apache Indian was nominated for a Ivor Novello award for best contemporary song for "Arranged Marriage", and nominated for a Mercury Music Prize for his debut album No Reservations in 1993. Apache Indian was also nominated for the Central Britain Media and Arts Asian Jewel Award in 2004. Apache was presented an award at the Asian Media Awards in Manchester UK for his talk show Real Talk (featured on Brit Asia TV) in 2013 and in 2014 he received the Lifetime Achievement Award also at the Asian Media Awards. In late 2014, Apache received a lifetime achievement award from Brit Asia TV.

Apache Indian did a limited release of his album "It Is What It Is" (IiWiI) in the fall of 2013 on Universal India. The album's first single "Celebrate" was a collaboration with Canadian pop singer Raghav and producer Jim Beanz. The album was written and recorded in Philadelphia at the Sunset Entertainment Group headquarters, featuring production from Jim Beanz, Charlie Hype, TroyBoi and J.Nick.

He was awarded the British Empire Medal (BEM) in the 2021 New Year Honours for services to music and young people. and performed at the closing ceremony for the 2022 Commonwealth Games in his hometown of Birmingham.

Apache Indian Music Academy
In November 2013, Apache Indian opened the Apache Indian Music Academy at South and City College, in his hometown of Handsworth.

Awards
Best Newcomer British Reggae Industry Awards 1990
 UK Asian Music Awards – Best International Success 2003
 UK Asian Music Awards – Outstanding Achievement 2005
 UK Asian Music Awards – Lifetime Achievement Award 2011
 Brit Asia TV Music Awards - Lifetime Achievement Award 2014

Discography
Apache Indian has sold over 11 million albums worldwide.

Albums

Singles and EPs

References

External links

Apache Indian interview at Solid Pulse
Apache Indian chart hits at UK Official Charts
Apache Indian interview at Vh1 India, 2013
Apache Indian entry at Trouser Press

1967 births
Living people
Island Records artists
English male singers
English songwriters
British rappers of Indian descent
English reggae musicians
English people of Indian descent
English people of Punjabi descent
Musicians from Birmingham, West Midlands
Recipients of the British Empire Medal
British male songwriters